Pyrgiscus rufus is a species of sea snail, a marine gastropod mollusk in the family Pyramidellidae, the pyrams and their allies.

Taxonomy
Whether this species is distinct from Pyrgiscus crenatus (Brown, 1827) is controversial. Both are tentatively distinguished by Reñas & Rolán in Gofas et al. (2011) and by Giannuzzi-Saveli et al. (2014).

Description
The shell grows to a length of 5 mm.

Distribution
This species occurs in the Mediterranean Sea. Watson's record from Puerto Rico is probably not the same species.

References

 Giannuzzi-Savelli R., Pusateri F., Micali, P., Nofroni, I., Bartolini S. (2014). Atlante delle conchiglie marine del Mediterraneo, vol. 5 (Heterobranchia). Edizioni Danaus, Palermo, pp. 1– 111 with 41 unnumbered plates (figs. 1-363), appendix pp. 1–91.

External links
 To Encyclopedia of Life
 To World Register of Marine Species
 To Biodiversity Heritage Library (43 publications)
 To CLEMAM

Pyramidellidae
Gastropods described in 1836